11th Victim is a 1979 American made-for-television crime drama film directed by Jonathan Kaplan and starring Bess Armstrong and Max Gail.

The film was based partially on the activities of the Los Angeles Hillside Strangler and was subsequently released on home video under the title The Lakeside Killer.  Harry Northup, Harold Gould, and David Hayward round out the supporting cast of the movie.  The film was broadcast as a November Sweeps CBS Tuesday Night Movie.

Director Jonathan Kaplan went on to critical acclaim as a director of feature films including The Accused (1988), Unlawful Entry (1992), Love Field (1992) and Brokedown Palace (1999).

Plot
Jill Kelso (Bess Armstrong) is a Des Moines, Iowa television news anchor, whose younger sister, an aspiring actress, has entered a life of prostitution in Los Angeles. When the sister becomes the eleventh victim of a sex murderer, Kelso conducts her own undercover investigation into Hollywood's night world of commercial sex. Along the way, chemistry develops with a sympathetic cop (Max Gail) who tries to save her from becoming a victim herself.

Cast
 Bess Armstrong as Jill Kelso
 Max Gail as Andrew Spencer
 David Hayward as "Red" Brody
 Harold Gould as Benny Benito
 Pamela Ludwig as Sally Taylor
 Harry Northup as Officer Thorpe
 Eric Burdon as "Spider"
 Annazette Chase as Cathy Cronenberger
 John Hancock as Captain Long
 Dick Miller as Ned, Investigator
 Marilyn Jones as Cindy Lee
 Michael Cavanaugh as Steve Rish
 Alfred Dennis as Ed Little
 Tara Strohmeier as Janie
 Michelle Downey as Amy Black
 Vicki Le Mere as Katy
 William H. Burton as The Suspect
 Ines Pedroza as Wilma Smith

References

External links

CBS network films
1979 television films
1979 films
1970s serial killer films
American serial killer films
Crime television films
Films scored by Michel Colombier
Films directed by Jonathan Kaplan
1970s American films